Tomostele is a genus of air-breathing land snails, terrestrial pulmonate gastropod mollusks in the subfamily Enneinae of the family Streptaxidae.

Species
 Tomostele musaecola (Morelet, 1860)

References

 Germain, L. (1915). Contributions à la faune malacologique de l'Afrique équatoriale. XLI. Mollusques nouveaux des îles du Golfe de Guinée. Bulletin du Muséum national d'Histoire naturelle, Paris. 21 (7): 283-290.
  Holyoak, D. T.; Holyoak, G. A.; Lima, R. F. D.; Panisi, M.; Sinclair, F. (2020). A checklist of the land Mollusca (Gastropoda) of the islands of São Tomé and Príncipe, with new records and descriptions of new taxa. Iberus: Revista de la Sociedad Española de Malacología, (Iberus).38(2): 219-319.

External links
 Ancey C. F. (1885). "Nouvelles contributions malacologiques". Bulletin Societé malacologique de France 2: 113-146. page 143.
 Smith, E. A. (1898). On some land shells from Trinidad. Journal of Conchology. 9: 27–29

Streptaxidae